The Treaty for the Prohibition of Nuclear Weapons in Latin America and the Caribbean (commonly known as The Tlatelolco Treaty) is an international treaty that establishes the denuclearization of Latin America and the Caribbean. It was proposed by Adolfo López Mateos, the President of Mexico, and promoted by the Mexican diplomats Alfonso García Robles, Ismael Moreno Pino and Jorge Castañeda  ​as a response to the Cuban Missile Crisis (1962). For his efforts in favor of the reduction of nuclear weapons, García Robles was awarded the Nobel Peace Prize in 1982.

The preparation of the text was entrusted to the Preparatory Commission for the Denuclearization of Latin America (COPREDAL), which established its headquarters in Mexico City and held four plenary sessions. The Treaty was signed by the signatory countries on February 12, 1967 and entered into force on April 25, 1969.

The organization in charge of monitoring compliance with said treaty is  OPANAL (Organization for the Prohibition of Nuclear Weapons in Latin America and the Caribbean). Signed in 1967, it was the first treaty of its kind covering a populated area of the world, establishing a Nuclear-weapon-free zone stretching from the Rio Grande to Tierra del Fuego.

Provisions

Under the treaty, the states parties agree to  prohibit and prevent the "testing, use, manufacture, production or acquisition by any means whatsoever of any nuclear weapons" and the "receipt, storage, installation, deployment and any form of possession of any nuclear weapons."

The treaty requires its parties to conclude comprehensive safeguards agreements with the International Atomic Energy Agency and has a mechanism for states to request special inspections in case of suspected violations.  It formally entered into force when all states in zone brought those agreements into force.  It also has a provision allowing states to waive that entry into force requirement and bring the treaty into force on a national basis.

Protocols
There are two additional protocols to the treaty:
 Protocol I binds those overseas countries with territories in the region (the United States, the United Kingdom, France, and the Netherlands) to the terms of the treaty. 
 Protocol II requires the world's declared nuclear weapons states to refrain from undermining in any way the nuclear-free status of the region; it has been signed and ratified by the US, the UK, France, China, and Russia.

History
Meeting in the Tlatelolco district of Mexico City on 14 February 1967, the nations of Latin America and the Caribbean drafted this treaty to keep their region of the world free of nuclear weapons.
Whereas Antarctica had earlier been declared a nuclear-weapon-free zone under the 1961 Antarctic Treaty, this was the first time such a ban was put in place over a large, populated area.

COPREDAL was the Preparatory Commission for the Denuclearization of Latin America created after the Cuban Missile Crisis.  It consisted of four sets of sessions, all of them which held in Mexico City. The purpose of the sessions was to prepare a possible draft of the Treaty of Tlatelolco.

The United Nations Assembly authorized COPREDAL on 27 November 1963. The Preliminary Meeting on the Denuclearization of Latin America (REUPRAL) created the "Preparatory Commission for the Denuclearization of Latin America", COPREDAL.

There were four sets of COPREDAL's sessions. The first set of sessions took place from 15 to 22 March 1965, the second set of sessions from 23 August to 2 September 1965 and the third set of sessions from 19 April to 4 May 1965. The fourth set of sessions, also known as the Final Act, was divided into two parts. Part I started on 30 August 19 and Part II followed on  31 January to 14 February 1967.

In the first two sets of sessions, participants simply reported the activities that needed to be done in the following sets of sessions.  The agreements made in the third set of sessions consisted of presenting a report of the previous changes to de Co-ordinating Committee and preparing the draft for the following Treaty of the Prohibition of Nuclear Weapons in Latin America. At the end of the fourth session, the objective was to entry the treaty into force.

Preparatory Commission created two working groups. Working group 1 was in charge of investigating control systems and predominant technical problems. Working group 2 dealt with legal and political questions. A Drafting Group was also created in order to prepare the final texts.

Observers
Some other countries participated as observers, in every set of sessions such as Austria, Canada, Denmark, Federal Republic of Germany, France, India, Japan, Sweden, United Kingdom and United States of America. International organizations were present as well, for example the International Atomic Energy Agency (IAEA).

The Latin American countries other than Cuba all signed the treaty in 1967, along with Jamaica and Trinidad and Tobago, and all of these ratified the treaty by 1972.  The treaty came into force on 22 April 1968, after El Salvador had joined Mexico in ratifying it and waived the conditions for its entry into force in accordance with its Article 28.

Argentina ratified in 1994, more than 26 years after signature, and was thus unprotected by the zone during the Falklands War.

Other English-speaking Caribbean nations signed either soon after independence from the U.K. (1968, 1975, 1983) or years later (1989, 1992, 1994, 1995), all ratifying within 4 years after signing. However, as British territories they had been covered since 1969 when the U.K. ratified Protocol I.

The Netherlands ratified Protocol I in 1971; Suriname signed the Treaty in 1976 soon after independence from the Netherlands but did not ratify until 1997, 21 years after signing.
The U.S. signed Protocol I applying to Puerto Rico and the Virgin Islands in 1977 and ratified in 1981.
France signed Protocol I applying to its Caribbean islands and French Guiana in 1979 but only ratified in 1992.
All five NPT-recognized nuclear weapon states ratified Protocol II by 1979.

Cuba was the last country to sign and to ratify, in 1995 and on 23 October 2002, completing signature and ratification by all 33 nations of Latin America and the Caribbean. Cuba ratified with a reservation that achieving a solution to the United States hostility to Cuba and the use of the Guantánamo Bay military base for U.S. nuclear weapons was a precondition to Cuba's continued adherence.

The Mexican diplomat Alfonso García Robles received the Nobel Peace Prize in 1982 for his efforts in promoting the treaty.

Diplomatic consequences 
The basic agreement for Latin America is the possession of nuclear weapons directly or indirectly is prohibited. With the intention of The Kingdom of the Netherlands desire to participate, COPREDAL's members decided not to include countries outside the region, including those which had territories in the region.

The regional territories belonging to countries outside the region would decide either to permit or deny the passage of nuclear weapons; countries such as United States and France recognized those transit agreements. The Soviet Union refused to recognize such transit agreements.

Signers 

The following table lists the parties to the Treaty of Tlatelolco.  All are also parties to the Non-Proliferation Treaty.  The table also indicates which ones had become parties to the Treaty on the Prohibition of Nuclear Weapons (TPNW) by 20 June 2022.

See also 

 Treaty on the Prohibition of Nuclear Weapons

References

External links
 Treaty text
 OPANAL website
 Zone of Application map including oceans
 Status of Signatures and Ratifications
 The Official History of the Falklands Campaign: War and diplomacy By Lawrence Freedman

Politics of the Caribbean
Nuclear weapons policy
Cold War treaties
Treaties concluded in 1967
Treaties entered into force in 1969
Treaties of Argentina
Treaties of Barbados
Treaties of Belize
Treaties of Bolivia
Treaties of the military dictatorship in Brazil
Treaties of Chile
Treaties of Colombia
Treaties of Costa Rica
Treaties of Cuba
Treaties of Dominica
Treaties of Ecuador
Treaties of El Salvador
Treaties of Grenada
Treaties of Guatemala
Treaties of Guyana
Treaties of Haiti
Treaties of Honduras
Treaties of Jamaica
Treaties of Mexico
Treaties of Nicaragua
Treaties of Panama
Treaties of Paraguay
Treaties of Peru
Treaties of Saint Kitts and Nevis
Treaties of Saint Vincent and the Grenadines
Treaties of Saint Lucia
Treaties of Suriname
Treaties of Trinidad and Tobago
Treaties of Uruguay
Treaties of Venezuela
Treaties of the Dominican Republic
Treaties of the Bahamas
Treaties of Antigua and Barbuda
Treaties establishing nuclear-weapon-free zones
Treaties of the Netherlands
Treaties extended to the Netherlands Antilles
Treaties extended to Aruba
Treaties of the United States
Treaties extended to Puerto Rico
Treaties extended to the United States Virgin Islands
Treaties of the United Kingdom
Treaties extended to Anguilla
Treaties extended to Montserrat
Treaties extended to the British Virgin Islands
Treaties of France
Treaties of the People's Republic of China
Treaties of the Soviet Union
Treaties extended to the Cayman Islands
Treaties extended to the Falkland Islands
Treaties extended to South Georgia and the South Sandwich Islands
Treaties extended to the Turks and Caicos Islands